Beishanlong is a genus of giant ornithomimosaurian theropod dinosaur from the Early Cretaceous of China.

Discovery and naming

Three fossils of Beishanlong were in the early twenty-first century found in northwestern China at the White Ghost Castle site, in the province of Gansu. The type species is Beishanlong grandis, described and named online in 2009 by a team of Chinese and American paleontologists, and formally published in January 2010 by the same Peter Makovicky, Li Daiqing, Gao Keqin, Matthew Lewin, Gregory Erickson and Mark Norrell. The generic name combines a references to the Bei Shan, the "North Mountains", with a Chinese long, "dragon". The specific name means "large" in Latin, in reference to the body size.

Beishanlong lived in the late Aptian stage, with its fossils being uncovered in layers of the Xinminpu Group, in the Xiagou Formation. The holotype is FRDC-GS GJ (06) 01-18, found in 2006, consisting of a partial skeleton lacking the skull. The paratypes consist of two specimens found in 2007: one consisting of remains of hindlimbs, the other, FRDC-GS JB(07)01-01, being a pair of pubes. A fourth fossil found in 1999, IVPP V12756 consisting of foot bones, was tentatively referred to the species.

Description

Beishanlong is of a considerable size, approximating the largest-known individuals of Gallimimus, which have been estimated to reach eight metres. According to the description, Beishanlong "is one of the largest definitive ornithomimosaurs yet described, though histological analysis shows that the holotype individual was still growing at its death." A histological study of the bone structure of the fibula found thirteen or fourteen growth lines, indicating the individual was subadult, though growth had already slowed.

The build of Beishanlong was rather robust. The arms and legs were long, though lacking the extremely elongated hands, feet and claws of later forms.

Classification
Beishanlong was by the describers assigned to the Ornithomimosauria, in a more basal position. Beishanlong was closely related to fellow ornithomimosaurian Harpymimus. Together they formed a polytomy with the main ornithomimosaurian branch just below Garudimimus. In 2014 Yuong-Nam Lee et al. recovered Beishanlong as a member of Deinocheiridae basal to a clade containing Garudimimus and Deinocheirus.

See also
 Timeline of ornithomimosaur research

References

External links
 "Field Museum palaeontologist leads study on two new dinosaurs from China" ScienceCentric.com

Early Cretaceous dinosaurs of Asia
Ornithomimosaurs
Fossil taxa described in 2010
Taxa named by Mark Norell
Paleontology in Gansu